The Guayaquil Canton, officially the Municipality of Guayaquil, is a canton in the center of the Guayas Province in western Ecuador. The canton was named after its seat, the city of Guayaquil, the most populous city in Ecuador.

Political divisions
The canton is divided into 16 urban parishes and 5 rural parishes. The urban parishes make up the city of Guayaquil.

Urban parishes
Ayacucho
Bolivar (Sagario) 
Carbo (Concepcion)
Chongón
Febres Cordero
Garcia Moreno
Letamendi
Nueva de Octubre
Olmedo (San Alejo)
Pascuales
Roca
Rocafuerte
Sucre
Tarqui
Urdaneta
Ximena
Rural parishes
Juan Gomez Rendon (Progreso) 
Morro
Posorja
Puná
Tenguel

Demographics
Ethnic groups as of the Ecuadorian census of 2010:
Mestizo  70.8%
White  11.4%
Afro-Ecuadorian  10.9%
Montubio  5.0%
Indigenous  1.4%
Other  0.6%

References

 
Cantons of Guayas Province